Acelyphus is a genus of beetle flies. It is known from the Indomalayan realm.

Description
Acelyphus may be distinguished by the discal and second basal cell of the wing being joined.

Species
A. boettcheri Frey, 1941
A. burmanus Datta, 1987
A. digitatus Tenorio, 1969
A. lateralis Tenorio, 1969
A. lyneborgi Vanschuytbroeck, 1967
A. melanothorax Tenorio, 1969
A. politus Malloch, 1929
A. prolatus Tenorio, 1972
A. repletus Malloch, 1929
A. retusus Tenorio, 1972
A. stigmaticus (Hendel, 1914)

References

Celyphidae
Diptera of Asia
Lauxanioidea genera